Zamia herrerae is a species of plant in the family Zamiaceae. It is found in El Salvador, Guatemala, Honduras, and Mexico. It is threatened by habitat loss.

References

gentryi
Flora of Chiapas
Flora of El Salvador
Flora of Guatemala
Flora of Honduras
Taxonomy articles created by Polbot